The Chuck Wagon Gang is a Country gospel musical group, formed in 1935 by David P. ("Dad") Carter, oldest son Ernest ("Jim") along with daughters Lola ("Rose") and Effie ("Anna"). The group got their first radio break as sponsored singers for Bewley Flour in 1936. The "Gang" signed with Columbia Records and remained with them for 39 years, a world record that lasted until 2000, when Johnny Mathis' overall time with the same label (combining his signing in 1957 and re-signing in 1968) entered its 40th year. At one point they were Columbia's number one group with over 39 million in record sales.

The Chuck Wagon Gang has performed at Carnegie Hall, the Hollywood Bowl, and the Grand Ole Opry. The group has been inducted into the Gospel Music Hall of Fame and the Smithsonian Institution's classic American recordings.

1930s to 1970s 
The group was founded in 1935  broadcasting from radio station KFYO in Lubbock, Texas, and took the name in 1936 when they moved to WBAP in Fort Worth.  The original members sang together all the way to 1955 when Dad Carter retired, later passing away in 1963, followed by Jim in 1971.  Sons Eddie and Roy Carter stepped in to sing tenor and bass, respectively, which began the tradition of Carter siblings, children and eventually grandchildren joining the Gang.

By the mid-1970s, the group was still touring part-time but felt a lack of support from the label they had recorded for during the previous three decades.  Columbia had stopped servicing their songs to radio; thus airplay had become non-existent. The decision was eventually made to move on from Columbia in the interest of rebuilding the group to a position akin to what it had enjoyed in years past. To that end, in 1979 they began recording for Copperfield Records and remained with that label for several years.

1980s to Present Day
After its relationship with Copperfield Records ended, the Chuck Wagon Gang began recording for Associated Artists.  It was during this era that the group took advantage of its renewed popularity and, in keeping with the gospel sounds of the time, added a piano player to the lineup for live concerts.  Fans responded positively to this sound, eventually culminating in the Gang receiving the "Best Gospel Group in Country Music" award at the Music City News Awards in 1988. 

Roy approached Anna's granddaughter Shaye in 1993, asking her to assume the responsibility of singing soprano upon the retirement of member Debbie Trusty.  Shaye accepted Roy's offer and sang soprano with the Gang until the retirement of alto singer Ruth Ellen Carter Yates a few years later, when she moved to her current position of alto singer.   Roy subsequently retired, bringing about a new era for the Gang in which none of Dad Carter's children were members.  As the 21st century dawned, the Gang sought to return to its origins, paring its sound back to the beautiful simplicity of four-part harmony accompanied by a single guitar.  Once again, fans responded positively.  As of 2021, the Gang records for the Crossroads Music label.

Members 

Shaye Smith – alto, manager/owner  (1994–2007, 2010–) (granddaughter of original alto Anna Carter Gordon Davis)
Melissa Kemper – soprano (2001–2006, 2015–)
Josh Garner - tenor (2021–)  
Darrell Morris – bass and guitar (2021–)

Former members
Original members:
 David P. (Dad) Carter – tenor, mandolin (1936–1955)
 Rose (Lola) Carter Karnes – soprano (1936–1975)
 Anna (Effie) Carter Gordon Davis – alto (1936–1975, 1978) (Married to former Governor Jimmie Davis of Louisiana from 1968 - 2000)
 Jim (Ernest) Carter – bass, guitar (1936–1953, 1968–1970)
 Roy Carter - Bass, Manager (1952 - 1997)

Others

Louise Clark Porterfield 
Jim Waits
Haskel "Hi-Pockets" Mitchell
Eddie Carter
Howard Gordon
Ronnie Crittenden
Pat McKeehan
Greg Gordon (Son of Anna) see Billboard Feb 3 1968.
Vicki Gordon (Owens) (Daughter of Anna)
Ronnie Page
Bettye Carter Goodwin
Ruth Ellen Carter Yates
Shirley Carter
Patricia Neighbors
Harold Timmons
Debby Trusty
Anita Saylor
Kathy Watson
Renee' Martin
Jim Wesson
Rick Karnes
Ronnie Page
Allen Thompkins
Penny Greene Shelnut
Kelly Jennings
Dave Emery 
Julie Hudson
Jeremy Stephens
Kasey Owens
Grant Owens
Stan Hill
Wyatt Austin
Karl Smakula 
Scotty Owenby 

* Source 'CWG 70th Ann. CD Cover'

Partial discography

Joy to the World (1954)
Perfect Joy (1960)
God's Gentle People (1962)
He Walks With Me (1963)
That Old Time Religion (1964)
Joy Bells Ringing in My Soul (1965)
Christmas with the Chuck Wagon Gang (1965; reissue of Joy to the World with two additional songs)
Lord, Lead Me On (1966)
Move Up to Heaven (1967)
Songs of Faith & Glory (1967)
The Glory Land Way (1967)
Revival Time (1968)
Rejoice (1969)
Standing on the Rock (1969)
The Chuck Wagon Gang's Greatest Hits (1969)
Thank the Lord (1970)
Going Home for Christmas (1970)
Oh What a Happy Day (1973)
Camp Meetin' Time (1974)
Greatest Hits - Volume 1 (1990)Keep On Keepin' On (1993)Gathered Together (2002)The Acoustic Sound of the Chuck Wagon Gang (2003)Live at Renfro Valey (2003)Live in Branson (2004)Clinging to a Saving Hand (2005)Timeless Hymns (2006)70th Anniversary CD (with Various Artists) (2006)Remembering the Old Songs (2007)Reminiscing (2008)Country Gospel Treasures (2009)The Best Is Yet to Be (2011)The Chuck Wagon Gang Complete Recordings 1936–1955 (2014)Meeting in Heaven – The Chuck Wagon Gang Sings the Songs of Marty Stuart'' (2014)

Awards
1955: Disc Jockey Association Award- #1 Gospel Group in America
1985: Dad Carter was Inducted into the Gospel Music Hall of Fame
1986: SESAC Award- 50 Years of Recorded Gospel Music
1987: SESAC Award- Lifetime Achievement Award
1988, 1989: TNN/Music City News Award- Country Gospel Group of the Year
1989: Marvin Norcross Award
1991, 1992: TNN/Music City News Award- Country Gospel Group of the Year
1998: Rose and Anna Inducted into the Gospel Music Hall of Fame
2011: Roy Carter Inducted into the Gospel Music Hall of Fame

References

External links
 
 Former Record Label For Chuck Wagon Gang and additional info/product
 (http://www.chuckwagongang.com/) Historical Page For Chuck Wagon Gang

American Christian musical groups
Columbia Records artists
Gospel quartets
Musical groups established in 1935
Southern gospel performers